Sayyid Hossein Mousavi Tabrizi (was born 1947 in Tabriz) is an Iranian Shiite mujtahid, writer, researcher, judge and politician. He is professor the high-level of Qom Hawza. The most important political posts of Mousavi Tabrizi is secretary Assembly of Qom Seminary Scholars and Researchers, Head of Iran's House of Parties and Vice-President of Pervasive Coalition of Reformists. He is perhaps best known for signing the death sentences of members of the Local Spiritual Assembly of the Baha'is of Tehran in 1981, who had been kidnapped and subsequently tortured and finally executed purely on religious grounds.

References

People from Tabriz
20th-century Iranian judges
Members of the Assembly of Experts
1947 births
Iranian reformists
Al-Moussawi family
Living people
Iranian prosecutors
Assembly of Qom Seminary Scholars and Researchers members
Secretaries-General of political parties in Iran
Rotating Presidents of the Council for Coordinating the Reforms Front